Zhou Fang (c. 730–800), courtesy name Zhonglang, was a Chinese painter during the Tang dynasty. Zhou lived in the Tang capital of Chang'an (modern Xi'an) during the 8th century. He came from a noble background and this was reflected in his works, such as Court Ladies Adorning Their Hair with Flowers (attributed) and Court Lady With Servants. Zhou Fang's artistic activity is long, up to three to four decades, running parallel to the Dàlì to Zhenyuan era (766–805), his artistic activity was mainly concentrated in Chang'an and Jiangnan.

He personally painted for the Emperor, the themes of his artwork would cover religious subjects and everyday life. He was influenced by the pure and detailed style of Gu Kaizhi and Lu Tanwei from the Six Dynasties period in his work.

The late Tang art critic Zhu Jingxuan said:

Due to his official career and aristocratic status, Zhou lived and worked with many notabilities. He was a contemporary of the fame Tang dynasty painter, Wu Daozi and took the opportunity to absorb Zhang Xuan's painting themes and artistic techniques. Both their style of tracing in their works are so similar that later generations have to distinguish between the small differences of the color stained on the lady figures.

Zhou created paintings that represented goddesses who were modeled after imperial court ladies, a development that indicated religious painting was to become more realistic, and that secular painting was beginning to take on its initial form. His portrait paintings emphasized real life, and as forerunners of secular lady paintings, they had a big influence on later paintings of court ladies. He was a famous religious and character painter, and the most famous painting Zhou created is a Buddhist image called "Water Moon Goddess of Mercy". His Buddhist painting has become a long-standing popular standard, known as "Zhou Jiaxiang".

Gallery

See also
Wang Wei, another notable painter of the early to mid Tang dynasty

References

Skillful Court Lady Painters, describing the work of Zhou Fang and Zhang Xuan
"Zhou Fang", Influence of Yan Liben (in Chinese painting: Sui(581-618) and Tang (618-907) dynasties), Encyclopedia Britannica
《太平广记·卷第二百一十三·画四·周昉传》

730 births
800 deaths
8th-century Chinese painters
Artists from Xi'an
Buddhist artists
Painters from Shaanxi
Tang dynasty painters